Jerzy Rembas (born 18 April 1956 in Gorzów Wielkopolski, Poland) is a Polish former international motorcycle speedway rider who appeared in the Speedway World Championship finals twice, missing out on a rostrum place after finishing third in the third-place run-off to Scott Autrey and Dave Jessup.

Rembas rode for Stal Gorzów in Poland from 1971 until his retirement in 1990. He rode for Leicester Lions in the British League in 1978 and Wimbledon Dons in 1981.

World Final appearances

Individual World Championship
 1976 -  Chorzów, Silesian Stadium -  14th - 3pts
 1978 -  London, Wembley Stadium -  5th - 11pts  + 1pt

World Team Cup
 1975 -  Norden, Motodrom Halbemond (with Henryk Glücklich / Zenon Plech / Edward Jancarz / Marek Cieślak ) - 4th - 9pt (2)
 1976 -  London, White City Stadium (with Edward Jancarz / Zenon Plech / Marek Cieślak  / Bolesław Proch) - 2nd - 28pts (5)
 1977 -  Wrocław, Olympic Stadium (with Edward Jancarz / Bogusław Nowak / Marek Cieślak  / Ryszard Fabiszewski) - 2nd - 25pts (6)
 1978 -  Landshut, Ellermühle Stadium (with Edward Jancarz / Zenon Plech / Marek Cieślak / Andrzej Huszcza) - 3rd - 16+3pts (3)
 1980 -  Wrocław, Olympic Stadium (with Zenon Plech / Roman Jankowski / Andrzej Huszcza / Edward Jancarz) - 3rd - 15pt (0)

References 

1956 births
Living people
Polish speedway riders
Leicester Lions riders
Wimbledon Dons riders
Sportspeople from Gorzów Wielkopolski